The 1963–64 Albanian National Championship was the 26th season of the Albanian National Championship, the top professional league for association football clubs, since its establishment in 1930.

Overview
It was contested by 12 teams, and Partizani won the championship.

League table

Note: 'Labinoti' is Elbasani, '17 Nëntori' is Tirana, 'Lokomotiva Durrës' is Teuta, 'Traktori' is Lushnja

Results

Relegation/promotion playoff

References
Albania - List of final tables (RSSSF)

Kategoria Superiore seasons
1
Albania